Isulan, officially the Municipality of Isulan (Jawi: ايڠايد نو ايسولن), is a 1st class municipality and capital of the province of Sultan Kudarat, Philippines.  According to the 2020 census, it has a population of 97,490 people.

Etymology
The Christian settlers would have preferred to decide the name of their new town by referendum. However, Captain Gunting, both revered and feared, had decided it by himself.

Datu Kudanding had reacted to the history of local battles way back in the early. Until 19th century when a sultanate in the adjacent town of Maganoy under Sultan Utto with a vast army decided to attack a small municipality located in the area now encompassed by the new entity under the leadership of Sultan Kudarat Mopak. Outnumbered with the ratio of 20:1, Sultan Kudarat Mopak on a white horse decided to do battle with his men notwithstanding the odds.

The battle cry of Sultan Kudarat was the uttering of the word, "Isu-silan" which means "They are there, advance". This intrepid, although suicidal show of force and determination, so impressed by Utto, that in order to save lives on both sides, he decided to resolve the issue by negotiation, thus placing Kudarat and his principality under his protectorate of Utto, Isulan municipality derived its name from "Isu-silan" which means "Progress".

History
The present territories of Isulan formerly belonged to the municipalities of Koronadal and Dulawan. The municipality of Koronadal was created under E.O. No. 82 dated August 8, 1947 by Pres. Manuel L. Roxas.

On March 10, 1953, the municipality of Norala was created by virtue of E.O.NO.572, whose territorial jurisdiction was taken from the municipality of Koronadal.

Datu Kudanding Camsa in the latter part of 1956 initiated the creation of another municipality to be taken from the Municipality of Norala.

On March 20, 1957, Engr. Jose M. Ancheta of the Bureau of Public Highways of Cotabato made its first endorsement to the provincial board and laid down the proposed boundaries of the new municipality.

Acting on this report, the provincial board of Cotabato thru Resolution No. 316 series of 1957, petitioned the President of the Philippines to create the proposed municipality.

Executive Order No. 266, pursuant to section 68 of the Administrative Code, issued and signed by the then President Carlos P. Garcia on August 30, 1957, creating the municipality of Isulan, whose territorial jurisdiction was taken from the municipality of Norala, South Cotabato, and Dulawan, Cotabato.

With the creation of the municipality of Isulan, Kalawag became the seat of its government. The municipal government officially functioned on September 12, 1957, with the appointment of its municipal mayor Datu Suma Ampatuan who served until 1967.

The Kalawag Settlement
In 1951, the Board of Directors of the Land Settlement and Development Cooperation (LASEDECO) started the opening of a settlement in an area formerly under the jurisdiction of the National Land Settlement Association (NLSA) as a reservation.

The LASEDECO had surveyed and parceled out home and farm lots and constructed municipal and barrio roads and installed electrical light generators. It had brought-in hundreds of farm tractors which uprooted big trees, cleared obstruction, planned, cleaned and harrowed the wide stretches of the area. What was once a marshy and wild expanse inhabited by snakes, crocodiles, wild cattle, swine, and deer had welcomed the first sprout of seedlings of corn and rice, thus blanketed the horizon in endless green.

When a group of 72 World War II  Veterans, led by Venancio Magbanua, Post Commander of Norala had come and settled in the area, on September 7, 1950, a Kalawag root crop used as food coloring  was found out abundantly growing.

Then, the early settlers decided to call and register the settlement as "Kalawag Settlement District of LASEDECO". The area comprising the town site covers approximately 400 hectares.

Immigrants from Visayas and Luzon had now come in shiploads. The most numerous batch was the "PACSA" group headed by Pedro Gabriel and Bienvenido Pamintuan otherwise known as the "Presidential Assistance Commission on Social Amelioration of the President Ramon Magsaysay.  His group consisted of the erstwhile and rebellious surrenderees belonging to HUKBALAHAPs from Pampanga.

On June 21, 1969, President Marcos, signed R.A. No. 5960, creating the municipality of Bagumbayan which cost Isulan more than 85% of its original land area. But of the original land area of 336,000 hectares, only 49,551 hectares were left and the 48 barrios were reduced to 17.

Upon the passage of H.B. No. 5020 dividing the province of Cotabato, the Municipal Council of Isulan passed Resolution No. 17 dated May 31, 1972, requesting Congressman Salipada K. Pendatun and Gov. Carlos B. Cajelo that Isulan be made a capital town.

On November 22, 1973, P.D. No. 341 was issued dividing Cotabato provinces, namely; Sultan Kudarat, Maguindanao, and North Cotabato. At the same time, Isulan, which is in the center of the new province, was made its capital.

Security incidences
On August 28, 2018, at 8:34 pm, there were three casualties and 36 hurt during the Hamungaya Festival when an improvised explosive device went off in Barangay Kalawag 3, in front of J and H marketing, National Highway. Five days later, on September 2, at 11:35 pm, another bomb exploded in an Internet cafe leaving one casualty and 15 hurt, four of them in critical condition. Authorities blamed both incidences on Bangsamoro Islamic Freedom Fighters.

On April 3, 2019, 18 people, including children, were injured when an improvised explosive device exploded at Carlitos Chicken House, possibly motivated by extortion.

On September 7, 2019, at 7 am, an improvised explosive device went off in front of the public market, leaving seven people injured.

Geography
Isulan is centrally located and is accessible to all neighboring towns not only within the province of Sultan Kudarat but also in some municipalities of the province of Maguindanao, South Cotabato and even that of Davao del Sur.

Barangays
Isulan is politically subdivided into 17 barangays.

Climate

Demographics

Languages
Hiligaynon is the predominantly spoken language in the municipality, with the bulk of Isulan's population predominantly consisting of descendants of settlers who came from the Hiligaynon-speaking parts of the Visayas, namely the islands of Negros and Panay. The Maguindanao-speaking minority was formed by migrations from neighboring Maguindanao-speaking towns and provinces. Other languages spoken in the city are Cebuano, Ilocano, Karay-a, Kapampangan, Chavacano, and others.

Economy

Isulan has various department stores and a mall, the list below contains the current malls and the future shopping centers in Isulan.
CityMall Isulan - owned by Double Dragon Properties and SM investment, opened on December 18, 2018.
MGM Shopping Plaza - one of the biggest shopping centers operating in Isulan.
Isulan Central Plaza - first department store and one of the oldest in Isulan. Opened in the late 1990s. 
Novo Shirts and Jeans - acquired the old Licon Cinema Building
New Valencia Dry Good Store and Gen. Mdse. - offers ready-to-wear and grocery.

Transportation
The municipality has an integrated terminal with buses, vans and jeepneys going to various areas of Soccsksargen, Maguindanao and Davao Region.

Bus companies include:
Yellow Bus Line, Inc. General Santos and Koronadal City
Husky Tours Cotabato City, Koronadal City
Mindanao Star Cotabato City and Davao City

Culture

Festival
Every month of August 30, the municipality of Isulan conducts the Hamungaya Festival to celebrate its foundation. Isulanons believe that the wealth of arts and culture is expressed in many forms and in so many kinds. The festival showcases skills and talents in literary, musical and cultural aspects of the constituents both young and old.

The Hamungaya also depicts the thanksgiving festival of its residents who are mostly engaged in agriculture. This includes rice and corn farming, vegetables and crops production including the famous African palm which has contributed a lot to the utilization of its by-products as construction materials – the uniquely woven "kalakat" known all over Mindanao.

The festival is divided into two parts: the first part shows the different activities being done in the farm. After which a thanksgiving is performed for their good harvest. The second part shows the merrymaking in the form of dance using different properties and materials that make it very festive.

As a whole, the Hamungaya Festival actually expresses life itself or deep-seated emotion communicated by the emotions of the human body blending with the music. The flow of body movements, the sound of the music and the grace with which the dance is executed all build up the story or emotions being communicated.

No doubt, this is a unique form of art, and along with other activities or talent being displayed during festivities, it is a contribution to the dreams of establishing solidarity among the peoples in the province of Sultan Kudarat.

Tourism

Lagandang Hot Spring/Sulphur Spring
Kamanga Cave and Falls
Baton Falls
Daguma Mountain range
LandMark of the Royalty
Narra Park
Stallion Farm
El Paraiso de Gelu

Healthcare
Isulan Doctor's Specialist Center
Holy Nazarene Clinic and Hospital
Galinto Family Hospital
Matias Hospital
Retirado Clinic and Hospital
Sultan Kudarat Provincial Hospital
St. Dominic Savio General Hospital Inc.

Education
Privately run academic schools

Green Valley College Foundation, Inc. (Isulan Campus)
Montessori Learning Center (Isulan Campus) 
The Notre Dame of Isulan, Inc.
Isulan Community School.
Precious Ones Learning Center
King's College of Isulan

Government-run schools
East Isulan District elementary school
Kalawag Central Elementary School
Kalawag III Elementary School
Central Isulan District elementary schools
Isulan Central Elementary School
Don Juan P. Garcia Memorial Elementary School
Dansuli Elementary School
Impao Elementary School
Datu Talipasan Memorial Elementary School
Mapantig Elementary School
South Isulan District elementary schools
Bambad Central School
Kolambog Elementary School
Kudanding Elementary School
West Isulan District elementary schools
Laguilayan Central School
Kamanga Elementary School
New Egana Elementary School
D. Lotilla Elementary School
Tayugo Elementary School
New Pangasinan Elementary School
Bual Elementary School
Lagandang Elementary School
Mantisao Elementary School
Public secondary schools
Isulan National High School
Bambad National High School
Laguilayan National High School
New Pangasinan High School

Government-owned tertiary institution
Sultan Kudarat State University (Isulan Campus)

References

External links

Isulan Profile at PhilAtlas.com
  Isulan Profile at the DTI Cities and Municipalities Competitive Index
[ Philippine Standard Geographic Code]
Philippine Census Information
Local Governance Performance Management System 

Municipalities of Sultan Kudarat
Provincial capitals of the Philippines
Establishments by Philippine executive order